Johannes Maria Jozef "Hans" van Leeuwen (born 5 August 1932) is a Dutch physicist.

Van Leeuwen was born in Heerhugowaard. In 1962 he obtained his doctorate at the University of Amsterdam under professor J. de Boer with a thesis titled: "Diagram techniques in statistical mechanics". In 1969 he became professor of physics at Delft University of Technology. He was appointed professor of theoretical physics at Leiden University in 1986.

Van Leeuwen was elected a member of the Royal Netherlands Academy of Arts and Sciences in 1985. He was elected a Fellow of the American Physical Society in 1994 "For contributions to statistical physics, in particular to the understanding of static and dynamic correlations in fluids, and to real space renormalization group theory".

References

1932 births
Living people
Academic staff of the Delft University of Technology
20th-century Dutch physicists
Fellows of the American Physical Society
Academic staff of Leiden University
Members of the Royal Netherlands Academy of Arts and Sciences
People from Heerhugowaard
University of Amsterdam alumni